Ad Valvas (Latin, literally "at the doors") is the college newspaper of the Vrije Universiteit in Amsterdam, Netherlands.

History and profile
In print since 1952, Ad Valvas is published every Thursday during the academic year, 36 times a year. In 1979, the paper acquired editorial independence and no longer had to answer to the University's Board of Directors. From 1994 to 1999 Frank van Kolfschooten served as the editor-in-chief of the paper.

Ad Valvas had a circulation of 12,226 copies in the period of 2008-2009.

Notable staff
Renate Dorrestein

References

External links

1952 establishments in the Netherlands
Dutch-language newspapers
Mass media in Amsterdam
Newspapers established in 1952
Student newspapers
Weekly newspapers published in the Netherlands